Emil Fuchs may refer to:

 Emil Fuchs (artist) (1866–1929), Austrian artist
 Emil Fuchs (baseball) (1878–1961), German-born American baseball owner and executive
 Emil Fuchs (theologian) (1874–1971), German theologian

See also
Fuchs (disambiguation)